Guillermo Solá Aravena (July 25, 1929 – February 24, 2020) was a middle- and long-distance runner from Chile. He won the gold medal in the men's 3,000 metres steeplechase event at the 1955 Pan American Games. Solá represented his native South American country at the 1952 Summer Olympics in Helsinki, Finland.

References

Guillermo Solá's obituary 

1929 births
2020 deaths
Chilean male middle-distance runners
Chilean male long-distance runners
Athletes (track and field) at the 1951 Pan American Games
Athletes (track and field) at the 1952 Summer Olympics
Athletes (track and field) at the 1955 Pan American Games
Olympic athletes of Chile
Pan American Games gold medalists for Chile
Pan American Games silver medalists for Chile
Pan American Games medalists in athletics (track and field)
Chilean male steeplechase runners
Medalists at the 1951 Pan American Games
Medalists at the 1955 Pan American Games